The Tekna is a Sahrawi tribal confederation in southern Morocco and parts of northern Western Sahara.

Tekna may also refer to:

Tekna (Norway), a union for graduate technical and scientific professionals in Norway
Tekna, Morocco, a rural commune and town in Sidi Kacem Province, Morocco

See also
Tekna Teaching And Konkoor News Agency, a daily newspaper published in Iran